Giorgos Aloneftis (Greek: Γιώργος Αλωνεύτης; born January 3, 1976) is a Cypriot former football midfielder who played his entire club career for APOEL.

External links

1976 births
Living people
Cypriot footballers
Greek Cypriot people
Association football midfielders
APOEL FC players
Sportspeople from Nicosia